A rock castle is a type of medieval castle that directly incorporates natural rock outcrops into its defences to such an extent that the rock formations define the structure of the castle. Topographically, rock castles are classified as hill castles.

Layout 

By contrast with the usual hill castles, that utilize the bedrock as a foundation for the individual buildings, the entire structure of rock castles is shaped by natural, often isolated rock formations, such as rock towers or crags. Typically a rock castle was built on a rock that was able to provide a fortified position without any great additions. In simple fortifications of this type the rock could be climbed on simple ladders that were hoisted up in times of danger. Rock castles would also have wooden and stone structures built on or against them. The morphological characteristics of the rock were crucial to the extent and nature of any structures.

The rock on which the castle stands is always incorporated into its design. If the rock is easy to work (e.g. sandstone), rooms, passages, steps, well shafts and cisterns were invariably hacked out of it. The buildings, made of wood or stone, stood on or next to the rock and used it as a foundation or walls. The remains of wooden structures are not usually preserved today, but their location and appearance can be partially gauged by the joist bearings and joist holes still visible in the rock.

Rock castles occur in large numbers in the southern Palatinate (Palatinate Forest), in northern Alsace (North Vosges) as well as in North Bohemia and Saxon Switzerland, where great sandstone rocks provide the necessary prerequisite for their construction.

Most rock castles no longer exist today. Often the site was slighted and then used by local residents as a stone quarry, so that apart from man-made alterations to the rocks themselves, only a few traces are still visible. However, several rock castles, like the ruins of Neuwindstein still have impressive wall remains. A few rock castles were rebuilt in more recent times, e. g. Berwartstein Castle at the end of the 19th century and the imperial castle of Trifels Castle, which was to have become a "site of national remembrance" (nationalen Weihestätte) during the Nazi era. In both cases it was not a reconstruction of the medieval fortification but a contemporary new design.

Rock-hewn castles 

Castle researcher Otto Piper used the German phrase ausgehauene Burg (literally: "hewn-out castle") for castles that had rooms artificially hewn out of the rock on which the castle stood. His examples of such rock-hewn castles include Fleckenstein, Trifels and Altwindstein. From a constructional point of view there is a close relationship with cave castles, which are also often enhanced with rooms artificially cut out of the rock.

False interpretations 
The shapes carved out of the rock, such as foundation footings and putlock holes, are often wrongly interpreted by laymen as prehistoric or early history heathen cult sites. In some cases this has resulted in tourists being attracted, which in turn has caused considerable damage to these monuments. Foremost amongst these are Frankish castles in the Haßberge Hills, notably Lichtenstein Castle. The neighbouring castle of Rotenhan and others were inundated with visitors from throughout Europe. However, there is no archaeological evidence, as a rule, of pre-medieval use as site for cult rituals or sacrifices.

Important rock castles 

In Italy:
 , Sicily
 , Liguria

In France:
 Château de Hohbarr, Bas-Rhin
 Château de Hohenbourg, Bas-Rhin
 Château du Fleckenstein, Vosges

In Germany:
 Altdahn Castle, Palatinate Forest
 Berwartstein Castle, Palatinate Forest
 Grafendahn Castle, Palatinate Forest
 Königstein Fortress, Saxon Switzerland
 Neurathen Castle, Saxon Switzerland
 Scharzfels Castle, Harz perimeter
 Spangenberg Castle, Rhineland-Palatinate
 Tanstein Castle, Palatinate Forest
 Trifels Castle, Palatinate

In Austria:

 Arbesbach Castle, Lower Austria
 Dürnstein Castle, Lower Austria

In the Czech Republic:
 Frýdštejn Castle, Český ráj
 Helfenburk Castle (North Bohemia), Dauba Switzerland
 Rotštejn Castle, Český ráj
 Šaunštejn Castle, Bohemian Switzerland
 Sloup Castle, Lusatian Mountains
 Valečov Castle, Český ráj
 Vranov Castle, Český ráj
In Turkey:

 Rumkale

References

Literature 

 
 Walter Herrmann: Auf rotem Fels. G. Braun Buchverlag Karlsruhe, 

Castles by type